is a railway station in the city of Higashine, Yamagata Prefecture, Japan, operated by East Japan Railway Company (JR East).

Lines
Jimmachi Station is served by the Ōu Main Line, and is located 106.3 kilometers from the starting point of the line at Fukushima Station.

Station layout
The station originally had one island platform and one side platform; however, with the completion of the Yamagata Shinkansen, the island platform was removed to make way for tracks for the non-stop shinkansen services, leaving the station with a single side platform for a bi-directional track. The station is unattended.

History

Jimmachi Station opened on August 23, 1901. The station was absorbed into the JR East network upon the privatization of Japanese National Railways (JNR) on April 1, 1987.

Surrounding area
 Yamagata Airport
 JGSDF Camp Jinmachi

See also
 List of railway stations in Japan

External links

  

Railway stations in Japan opened in 1901
Railway stations in Yamagata Prefecture
Ōu Main Line
Higashine, Yamagata